The 2005–06 Elite Ice Hockey League season ran from September 9, 2005, through April 9, 2006. The Edinburgh Capitals and Newcastle Vipers joined the Elite League from the British National League while the Manchester Phoenix did not participate for a second season due to a lack of suitable ice facility.

The Sheffield Steelers changed ownership, with Bob Phillips purchasing the club from Norton Lea while Mike Blaisdell surprised many amongst the British ice hockey community by returning to coach the Nottingham Panthers, several years after an acrimonious departure.

The London Racers withdrew their team mid way through the season citing concerns that the Lee Valley Ice Centre was unsafe for Elite League level ice hockey to be played on after a series of incidents involving players and spectators.

Regulations regarding the number of non-British trained players remained at the same level as the 2004–05 season while the collapse of the British National League during the close season prevented the return of the previous season's 'crossover' games between the teams of the two leagues.

The Coventry Blaze entered the Continental Cup as the United Kingdom's representative while the 2006 Winter Olympics provided the opportunity for the Kölner Haie and Iserlohn Roosters to play a series of games against three of the Elite League's members.

Challenge Cup

The format of the previous season's Challenge Cup remained the same with a separate round-robin group stage at the beginning of the season. Belfast decided not to take part in the competition due to the lack of available dates on which to play games at the Odyssey Arena. The eight participating teams were divided into two groups of four, with the winner and runner-up of each group progressing into a knockout semi final.

Group A

Group B

Semi-finals

Winner A Vs Runner-Up B
Cardiff Devils 2-2 Newcastle Vipers
Newcastle Vipers 0-1 Cardiff Devils (Cardiff win 3-2 on aggregate)
Winner B Vs Runner-Up A
Coventry Blaze 4-4 Nottingham Panthers
Nottingham Panthers 3-4 Coventry Blaze (Coventry win 8-7 on aggregate)

Final

In the repeat of the previous season's final, the Cardiff Devils claimed their first piece of silverware since the British Championship in 1999 by turning around a 3-0 first leg deficit to win the Cup on penalty shots after a 4-1 victory in the second leg.

First Leg
Coventry Blaze 3-0 Cardiff Devils
Attendance: 2,722
04.15 Coventry 1-0 Cardiff - Barrie Moore (Andreas Moborg, James Pease)
11.34 Coventry 2-0 Cardiff - Joel Poirier (Ashley Tait, Barrie Moore)
12.36 Coventry 3-0 Cardiff - Jeff Hutchins (Neal Martin)
Second Leg
Cardiff Devils 4-1 Coventry Blaze (4-4 on aggregate, after overtime, Cardiff win 1-0 on penalty shots)
Attendance: 2,334
00.20 Cardiff 1-0 Coventry - Nathan Rempel (Vezio Sacratini)
22.38 Cardiff 2-0 Coventry - Nathan Rempel (Vezio Sacratini, Jeff Burgoyne)
28.27 Cardiff 3-0 Coventry - Gerad Adams (Nathan Rempel)
36.54 Cardiff 3-1 Coventry - Jeff Hutchins (Russell Cowley, Tom Watkins)
59.40 Cardiff 4-1 Coventry - Nathan Rempel (Louis Goulet, Brad Voth)

Elite League Table

Belfast's decision to withdraw from the Challenge Cup allowed them to establish a commanding lead before the rest of the league had entered into their full league schedule. The Giants never relinquished first place and claimed the title on March 5, 2006 following nearest rival Newcastle's 5-2 defeat to Edinburgh.

Elite League Play Offs

All eight teams qualified for the playoffs, with final league standings determining which group each team was placed in. Group A consisted of the 1st, 4th, 5th and 8th placed teams while Group B comprised the 2nd, 3rd, 6th and 7th placed teams. The winner and runner-up from each group qualified for the finals weekend at Nottingham's National Ice Centre.

Group A

Group B

Semi-finals

Winner A vs Runner-Up B
Cardiff Devils 1-1 Sheffield Steelers (after overtime, Sheffield win 3-1 on penalty shots)
Winner B vs Runner-Up A
Newcastle Vipers 4-2 Belfast Giants

Final

Before a capacity crowd at the National Ice Centre, the Newcastle Vipers crowned their first season in the Elite Ice Hockey League with the Playoff Championship title.

Sheffield Steelers 1-2 Newcastle Vipers

9:13 Sheffield 1-0 Newcastle - Paul Sample (Mark Dutiaume, Rod Sarich)
23.05 Sheffield 1-1 Newcastle - Andre Payette (Shaun Johnson, David Longstaff) 
32:14 Sheffield 1-2 Newcastle - David Longstaff (Unassisted)

Other Competitions

Knockout Cup

After London withdrew from the league in November 2005, a number of clubs were left with a shortfall in the number of games covered by season tickets. The British Ice Hockey Cup (or Knockout Cup as it became popularly known as) was hastily arranged in order to allow for teams to fulfil ticket commitments.

After Nottingham decided not to take part, citing the lack of availability of the National Ice Centre as a reason, the Hull Stingrays were invited and agreed to take part in the competition.

The competition was won by the Sheffield Steelers, who defeated the Coventry Blaze on penalty shots after a 1-1 draw on aggregate in the two-legged final.

Ahearne Cup

The 2006 Winter Olympics in Turin meant that a number of Europe's biggest leagues took a two-week break while national teams were participating in the competition in Italy. The EIHL saw this as the perfect opportunity to revive the Ahearne Cup tournament last played in 2003. The Cologne Sharks and Iserlohn Roosters of the Deutsche Eishockey Liga played four games against Coventry, Nottingham and Sheffield.

In the end, the German sides defeated the EIHL with the DEL winning all four contests.

Coventry 2-4 Iserlohn
Coventry 3-9 Cologne
Sheffield 1-3 Iserlohn
Nottingham 2-6 Cologne

Awards
Coach of the Year Trophy – Rob Wilson, Newcastle Vipers
Player of the Year Trophy – Theo Fleury, Belfast Giants
Ice Hockey Annual Trophy – Tony Hand, Edinburgh Capitals
Alan Weeks Trophy – Jonathan Weaver, Newcastle Vipers
Best British Forward – Tony Hand, Edinburgh Capitals
Vic Batchelder Memorial Award – Nathan Craze, Belfast Giants

All Star teams

Scoring leaders
The scoring leaders are taken from all league games.

Most points: 81 Theo Fleury, Belfast Giants
Most goals: 30 Barrie Moore, Coventry Blaze
Most assists: 58 Theo Fleury, Belfast Giants
Most PIMs: 301 Brad Voth, Cardiff Devils

References
Ice Hockey Journalists UK
The Internet Hockey Database
Malcolm Preen's Ice Hockey Results and Tables

Elite Ice Hockey League seasons
1
United